Cima di Pertegà (Italian) or Cime de la Pertègue (French) is a mountain located on the French-Italian border between Piemonte and Provence-Alpes-Côte d'Azur.

History 
The mountain up to World War II was totally belonging to Italy but, following the Paris Peace Treaties, signed in February 1947, is now shared between Italy and France. In former times it was also named Cima Varcona o Cima Valcona

Geography 

 
The mountain belongs to the Ligurian Alps and is located on the main chain of the Alps. On its top three ridges meet: on the northern one a saddle at 2.207 m, sometimes named Colle di Capoves, divides the Cima di Pertegà from the Cime de Capoves (2.260 m). Going east a mountain ridge starts from Cima di Pertegà dividing Carnino valley (a north) from the central part of the Tanarello valley, while going South the Cima di Pertegà is divided by the nearby Cime de l'Eveque and Monte Bertrand by the steep saddle of the colle delle Selle Vecchie. On the Italian side of the mountain runs a former-military dirt road connecting  Monesi (a village of the municipality of Triora) with the colle di Tenda. The summit of the Cima di Pertegà is marked by a boundary marker, and close to it is located a small summit cross.

SOIUSA classification 
According to the SOIUSA (International Standardized Mountain Subdivision of the Alps) the mountain can be classified in the following way:
 main part = Western Alps
 major sector = South Western Alps
 section = Ligurian Alps
 subsection = (It:Alpi del Marguareis/Fr:Alpes Liguriennes Occidentales)
 supergroup = (It:Catena Marguareis-Mongioie/Fr:Chaîne Marguareis-Mongioie) 
 group = (It:Gruppo del Marguareis/Fr:Groupe du Marguareis) 
 subgroup = (It:Nodo del Marguareis/Fr:Nœud du Marguareis) 
 code = I/A-1.II-B.2.a

Environment 
The mountain is made of steep but regular and grassy slopes. Its NE slopes are included in the Parco naturale del Marguareis.

Hiking 
The mountain is accessible by walking tracks on steep meadows starting from the Colle dei Signori (North of the summit), Colle delle Selle Vecchie (South) or Passo di Framargal (East). The summit is also a well known winter hike, mainly for ski mountaineers.

Mountain huts 
 Rifugio Don Barbera

Maps

See also

 France–Italy border

References

Mountains of the Ligurian Alps
Mountains of Piedmont
Mountains of Alpes-Maritimes
Two-thousanders of France
France–Italy border
International mountains of Europe
Two-thousanders of Italy
Pertègue